Ridge regression is a method of estimating the coefficients of multiple-regression models in scenarios where the independent variables are highly correlated. It has been used in many fields including econometrics, chemistry, and engineering. Also known as Tikhonov regularization, named for Andrey Tikhonov, it is a method of regularization of ill-posed problems. It is particularly useful to mitigate the problem of multicollinearity in linear regression, which commonly occurs in models with large numbers of parameters. In general, the method provides improved efficiency in parameter estimation problems in exchange for a tolerable amount of bias (see bias–variance tradeoff).

The theory was first introduced by Hoerl and Kennard in 1970 in their Technometrics papers “RIDGE regressions: biased estimation of nonorthogonal problems” and “RIDGE regressions: applications in nonorthogonal problems”. This was the result of ten years of research into the field of ridge analysis.

Ridge regression was developed as a possible solution to the imprecision of least square estimators when linear regression models have some multicollinear (highly correlated) independent variables—by creating a ridge regression estimator (RR). This provides a more precise ridge parameters estimate, as its variance and mean square estimator are often smaller than the least square estimators previously derived.

Overview
In the simplest case, the problem of a near-singular moment matrix  is alleviated by adding positive elements to the diagonals, thereby decreasing its condition number. Analogous to the ordinary least squares estimator, the simple ridge estimator is then given by 

where  is the regressand,  is the design matrix,  is the identity matrix, and the ridge parameter  serves as the constant shifting the diagonals of the moment matrix. It can be shown that this estimator is the solution to the least squares problem subject to the constraint , which can be expressed as a Lagrangian:

which shows that  is nothing but the Lagrange multiplier of the constraint. Typically,  is chosen according to a heuristic criterion, so that the constraint will not be satisfied exactly. A more general approach to Tikhonov regularization is discussed below.

History
Tikhonov regularization has been invented independently in many different contexts.
It became widely known from its application to integral equations from the work of
Andrey Tikhonov and David L. Phillips. Some authors use the term Tikhonov–Phillips regularization.
The finite-dimensional case was expounded by Arthur E. Hoerl, who took a statistical approach, and by Manus Foster, who interpreted this method as a Wiener–Kolmogorov (Kriging) filter. Following Hoerl, it is known in the statistical literature as ridge regression, named after the shape along the diagonal of the identity matrix.

Tikhonov regularization 
Suppose that for a known matrix  and vector , we wish to find a vector  such that
 
The standard approach is ordinary least squares linear regression. However, if no  satisfies the equation or more than one  does—that is, the solution is not unique—the problem is said to be ill posed. In such cases, ordinary least squares estimation leads to an overdetermined, or more often an underdetermined system of equations. Therefore, in solving the inverse-problem, the inverse mapping operates as a high-pass filter that has the undesirable tendency of amplifying noise (eigenvalues / singular values are largest in the reverse mapping where they were smallest in the forward mapping).
Ordinary least squares seeks to minimize the sum of squared residuals, which can be compactly written as
 
where  is the Euclidean norm.

In order to give preference to a particular solution with desirable properties, a regularization term can be included in this minimization:
 
for some suitably chosen Tikhonov matrix . In many cases, this matrix is chosen as a scalar multiple of the identity matrix, giving preference to solutions with smaller norms; this is known as  regularization. In other cases, high-pass operators (e.g., a difference operator or a weighted Fourier operator) may be used to enforce smoothness if the underlying vector is believed to be mostly continuous.
This regularization improves the conditioning of the problem, thus enabling a direct numerical solution.
 
The effect of regularization may be varied by the scale of matrix . For  this reduces to the unregularized least-squares solution, provided that (ATA)−1 exists.

 regularization is used in many contexts aside from linear regression, such as classification with logistic regression or support vector machines, and matrix factorization.

Generalized Tikhonov regularization

 

where we have used  to stand for the weighted norm squared  (compare with the Mahalanobis distance). The Tikhonov matrix is then given as a factorization of the matrix  (e.g. the Cholesky factorization) and is considered a whitening filter.

This generalized problem has an optimal solution  which can be written explicitly using the formula

 

or equivalently

Lavrentyev regularization
In some situations, one can avoid using the transpose , as proposed by Mikhail Lavrentyev. For example, if  is symmetric positive definite, i.e. , so is its inverse , which can thus be used to set up the weighted norm squared  in the generalized Tikhonov regularization, leading to minimizing  
 
or, equivalently up to a constant term,
 .

This minimization problem has an optimal solution  which can be written explicitly using the formula

 ,

which is nothing but the solution of the generalized Tikhonov problem where 

The Lavrentyev regularization, if applicable, is advantageous to the original Tikhonov regularization, since the Lavrentyev matrix  can be better conditioned, i.e., have a smaller condition number, compared to the Tikhonov matrix

Regularization in Hilbert space
Typically discrete linear ill-conditioned problems result from discretization of integral equations, and one can formulate a Tikhonov regularization in the original infinite-dimensional context. The operator  is then a self-adjoint bounded invertible operator.

Relation to singular-value decomposition and Wiener filter
With , this least-squares solution can be analyzed in a special way using the singular-value decomposition. Given the singular value decomposition

with singular values , the Tikhonov regularized solution can be expressed as

where  has diagonal values

and is zero elsewhere. This demonstrates the effect of the Tikhonov parameter on the condition number of the regularized problem. For the generalized case, a similar representation can be derived using a generalized singular-value decomposition.

Finally, it is related to the Wiener filter:

Determination of the Tikhonov factor
The optimal regularization parameter  is usually unknown and often in practical problems is determined by an ad hoc method. A possible approach relies on the Bayesian interpretation described below. Other approaches include the discrepancy principle, cross-validation, L-curve method, restricted maximum likelihood and unbiased predictive risk estimator. Grace Wahba proved that the optimal parameter, in the sense of leave-one-out cross-validation minimizes

Using the previous SVD decomposition, we can simplify the above expression:

and

Relation to probabilistic formulation
The probabilistic formulation of an inverse problem introduces (when all uncertainties are Gaussian) a covariance matrix  representing the a priori uncertainties on the model parameters, and a covariance matrix  representing the uncertainties on the observed parameters.

Bayesian interpretation

Although at first the choice of the solution to this regularized problem may look artificial, and indeed the matrix  seems rather arbitrary, the process can be justified from a Bayesian point of view. Note that for an ill-posed problem one must necessarily introduce some additional assumptions in order to get a unique solution. For simplicity here, the following assumptions are made: the means are zero; their components are independent; the components have the same standard deviation .

If the assumption of normality is replaced by assumptions of homoscedasticity and uncorrelatedness of errors, and if one still assumes zero mean, then the Gauss–Markov theorem entails that the solution is the minimal unbiased linear estimator.

See also
 LASSO estimator is another regularization method in statistics.
 Elastic net regularization
 Matrix regularization

Notes

References

Further reading

 
 
 
 

Linear algebra
Estimation methods
Inverse problems
Regression analysis